U of E may refer to:

in Great Britain
 University of Edinburgh
 University of Exeter

in the Philippines
 University of the East 

in the United States
 University of Evansville, a university located in Indiana

See also
 UE (disambiguation)